Cryptomys is the genus of mole-rats, endemic to Africa. Most of the species formerly placed in this genus were moved to the genus Fukomys in 2006.

References

 Kock D, Ingram CM, Frabotta LJ, Honeycutt RL, Burda H. 2006. On the nomenclature of Bathyergidae and Fukomys n. gen. (Mammalia: Rodentia). Zootaxa 1142: 51–55. 

 
Rodent genera